Shit-e Kamarzard (also Romanized as Shīt-e Kamarzard; also known as Shīţ) is a village in Hasanabad Rural District, in the Central District of Eslamabad-e Gharb County, Kermanshah Province, Iran. At the 2006 census, its population was 322, in 67 families.

References 

Populated places in Eslamabad-e Gharb County